Niklas Friman (born August 30, 1993) is a Finnish professional ice hockey defenceman currently playing for Brynäs IF of the Swedish Hockey League (SHL).

Playing career
Friman made his SM-liiga debut playing with HC TPS during the 2011–12 SM-liiga season.

After splitting the 2021–22 season, between Jokerit of the Kontinental Hockey League (KHL) and former club HPK of the Liiga, Friman as a free agent signed his first contract in the SHL, agreeing to a two-year contract with Brynäs IF on 13 May 2022.

Career statistics

Regular season and playoffs

International

References

External links

1993 births
Living people
Brynäs IF players
HPK players
Finnish ice hockey defencemen
Jokerit players
JYP-Akatemia players
JYP Jyväskylä players
HC TPS players
TuTo players
People from Rauma, Finland
Ice hockey players at the 2022 Winter Olympics
Olympic ice hockey players of Finland
Medalists at the 2022 Winter Olympics
Olympic gold medalists for Finland
Olympic medalists in ice hockey
Sportspeople from Satakunta